The San Martín Glacier is a broad glacier flowing westward and bisecting the Argentina Range, in the Pensacola Mountains. It was mapped by the United States Geological Survey from surveys and U.S. Navy air photos in 1956–67, and named by the Advisory Committee on Antarctic Names for the Argentine icebreaker General San Martín, which brought the first party to General Belgrano Station on the Filchner Ice Shelf in 1954-55 and made numerous relief and resupply voyages to the area.

The Glacier is near the Belgrano II Base.

See also
 List of glaciers in the Antarctic
 Glaciology

References
 

Glaciers of Queen Elizabeth Land